Francis Basset (1715–1769) of Tehidy in the parish of Illogan, Cornwall, was a Westcountry landowner who served as a Member of Parliament for Penryn, Cornwall, in (1766–69).

Origins
He was the son of Francis Basset (1674–1721) of Tehidy, Sheriff of Cornwall in 1708,  by his wife Mary Pendarves. The Basset family was an ancient Westcountry family.

Marriage and children
He married Margaret St Aubyn, a daughter of Sir John St Aubyn, 3rd Baronet, by whom he had seven children, two sons and five daughters, including:
Francis Basset, 1st Baron de Dunstanville and Basset (1757-1835) of Tehidy, eldest son and heir.

External links 

 Francis Basset, 1st Baron de Dunstanville - entry on Dictionary of National Biography, containing details on his father's life

1715 births
1769 deaths
People from Illogan
Members of the Parliament of Great Britain for constituencies in Cornwall
British MPs 1761–1768
British MPs 1768–1774
Politicians from Cornwall